Tomasz Welna (born 27 January 1991) is a Polish professional footballer who plays as a defender for Polonia Warsaw.

Career
Welna started his senior career with Polonia Warsaw. In 2011, he signed for Ząbkovia Ząbki in the Polish I liga, where he made thirteen appearances and scored zero goals. After that, he played for KS Cracovia, Puszcza Niepołomice, Stomil Olsztyn, Aris Limassol, Olimpia Grudziądz, Widzew Łódź, MKP Pogoń Siedlce.

On 27 July 2020, he returned to Polonia Warsaw, now in the fourth-tier III liga.

Honours
Polonia Warsaw
III liga, group I: 2021–22

References

External links 
 NICE 1 LIGA Tomasz W Cotton returned to Poland, with Olimpia aiming for promotion
 Wool: "My goal is to help Widzew advance to the league" 
 Tomasz W Cotton, new Widzew player: "I come to trainings with a banana on my face" 
 T. Wełna: "Zakochałem się w Widzewie"

1991 births
People from Ciechanów
Sportspeople from Masovian Voivodeship
Living people
Polish footballers
Association football defenders
Polonia Warsaw players
Ząbkovia Ząbki players
MKS Cracovia (football) players
Puszcza Niepołomice players
OKS Stomil Olsztyn players
Aris Limassol FC players
Olimpia Grudziądz players
Widzew Łódź players
MKP Pogoń Siedlce players
Ekstraklasa players
I liga players
II liga players
III liga players
Cypriot First Division players
Polish expatriate footballers
Expatriate footballers in Cyprus